Robert Hans Friedrich Köbler (21 February 1912 – 7 September 1970) was a German organist, pianist, composer and professor at the University of Leipzig.

Köbler was born in Waldsassen. He studied church music in Leipzig from 1931 to 1934, organ with Karl Straube and piano with Carl Martienssen. Köbler was cantor and organist in Löbau from 1935 to 1945. From 1946 he had a teaching position for organ and harpsichord in Leipzig. In 1949 he became organist at the Paulinerkirche, Leipzig's university church. He was appointed professor of organ and harpsichord in 1956.

Köbler was primarily known as an organist, especially for his often humorous improvisations. Concert tours took him to Eastern and Western European countries.

Köbler died in Buch of cancer, at age 58.

Compositions 
Köbler wrote compositions for piano, organ and voice, including:
 Klavierstücke für Kinder (Edition Peters)
 Fünf Lieder nach Gedichten von Wilhelm Busch (Breitkopf & Härtel)
 Vier gemischte Chöre a cappella (Breitkopf & Härtel)
 Fünf Fugen (Edition Peters)

References

External links 
 
 Robert Köbler (Organ) Bach Cantatas Website 2011
 
 
 
 "Bleibet hier und wachet ..." / Die Universitätskirche zu Leipzig 1240–1968 – Eine Dokumentation Leipziger Universitätschor 1992
 Uraufführung erinnert an Kirchensprengung (in German) idw-online.de 23 May 2008
 Festkonzert in Weimar Neues Deutschland 14 April 1964

1912 births
1970 deaths
Musicians from Bavaria
German classical organists
German classical pianists
Male classical pianists
20th-century German composers
Academic staff of Leipzig University
Kirchenmusikdirektor
20th-century German male musicians